Milan Đurić (born 22 May 1990) is a Bosnian professional footballer who plays as a forward for Serie A club Hellas Verona.

Đurić started his professional career at Cesena, before joining Parma in 2010. Later that year, he was loaned to Ascoli and to Crotone a year later. In 2012, he went back to Cesena, who sent him on loan to Cremonese later that year, to Trapani the following year and to Cittadella the next year. In 2017, Đurić was transferred to Bristol City. He signed with Salernitana in 2018. Four years later, he moved to Hellas Verona.

A former youth international for Bosnia and Herzegovina, Đurić made his senior international debut in 2015, earning 15 caps until 2020.

Club career

Early career
Because of the outbreak of Bosnian War, Đurić's family fled from his native Bosnia and Herzegovina and moved to Italy, where he started playing football at local clubs, before joining Cesena's youth academy in 2006. He made his professional debut against Mantova on 30 October 2007 at the age of 17. On 8 December, he scored his first professional goal in a triumph over Frosinone.

In July 2010, Đurić switched to Parma in a co-ownership deal. In August, he was loaned to Ascoli for the rest of campaign. In January 2011, he was sent on a six-month loan to Crotone. In June, his loan was extended for an additional season.

In the summer of 2012, Đurić returned to Cesena, who immediately loaned him to Cremonese until the end of season. In July 2013, he was sent on a season-long loan to Trapani. In January 2014, he was loaned to Cittadella for the remainder of season.

In January 2017, he was transferred to English side Bristol City.

Salernitana
In August 2018, Đurić signed a four-year contract with Salernitana. He made his official debut for the club on 25 August against Palermo. On 30 March 2019, he scored his first goal for Salernitana against Venezia.

Đurić scored his first career hat-trick on 13 April.

He played his 100th game for the side in a loss to Torino on 12 September 2021.

Hellas Verona
In July 2022, Đurić moved to Hellas Verona on a three-year deal. He made his competitive debut for the team in Coppa Italia game against Bari on 7 August. A week later, he made his league debut against Napoli. On 4 January 2023, he scored his first goal for Hellas Verona against Torino.

International career
Đurić was a member of Bosnia and Herzegovina under-21 team under coach Vlado Jagodić.

In March 2015, he received his first senior call-up, for a UEFA Euro 2016 qualifier against Andorra and a friendly game against Austria. He debuted against the former on 28 March.

On 10 October, in a UEFA Euro 2016 qualifier against Wales, Đurić scored his first senior international goal. Three days later, he scored a goal against Cyprus, which secured the victory for his team and sent them into UEFA Euro 2016 qualifying play-offs.

He retired from international football on 25 May 2022.

Personal life
Đurić's father Goran was also a professional footballer, as is his younger brother Marco.

He married his long-time girlfriend Bianca in July 2016. Together they have two children, a daughter named Alice and a son named Cristian.

Career statistics

Club

International

Scores and results list Bosnia and Herzegovina's goal tally first, score column indicates score after each Đurić goal.

Honours
Cesena
Lega Pro Prima Divisione: 2008–09

References

External links

1990 births
Living people
Sportspeople from Tuzla
Serbs of Bosnia and Herzegovina
Bosnia and Herzegovina refugees
Bosnia and Herzegovina emigrants to Italy
Bosnia and Herzegovina footballers
Bosnia and Herzegovina under-21 international footballers
Bosnia and Herzegovina international footballers
Bosnia and Herzegovina expatriate footballers
Association football forwards
A.C. Cesena players
Parma Calcio 1913 players
Ascoli Calcio 1898 F.C. players
F.C. Crotone players
U.S. Cremonese players
Trapani Calcio players
A.S. Cittadella players
Bristol City F.C. players
U.S. Salernitana 1919 players
Hellas Verona F.C. players
Serie B players
Serie C players
Serie A players
English Football League players
Expatriate footballers in Italy
Expatriate footballers in England
Bosnia and Herzegovina expatriate sportspeople in Italy
Bosnia and Herzegovina expatriate sportspeople in England